Torneå is the Swedish name of Tornio, a city in northern Finland.

Ylitornio (Övertorneå) - a municipality in Finland
Övertorneå - a municipality in Sweden, Matarenki in Finnish.

See also
Meänkieli